Moss Creek Township is a township in Carroll County, in the U.S. state of Missouri.

Moss Creek Township took its name from Moss Creek, a creek noted for the moss lining its course.

References

Townships in Missouri
Townships in Carroll County, Missouri